Klaus Bugdahl (born 24 November 1934) is a retired German cyclist who was active between 1954 and 1978 both on the road and track. He won the German National Road Race in 1958.

On track, he won several medals at European championships, mostly in the madison event. On the road, he competed in 228 six-day races and won 37 of them, nearly all in his native Germany, which places him as one of the ten most successful racers. He completed his last six-day race in 1978 in Milan, aged 43. His racing partners included Eddy Merckx, Patrick Sercu, Rolf Wolfshohl, Rudi Altig, Dieter Kemper and Rik Van Steenbergen.

References

1934 births
Living people
German male cyclists
Cyclists from Berlin
German cycling road race champions
German track cyclists
Tour de Suisse stage winners
20th-century German people